Henning Weid (born 28 October 1950) is a Norwegian Nordic combined skier. He was born in Oslo, and represented the club Nydalens Skiklub He competed at the 1972 Winter Olympics in Sapporo, where he placed 19th.

References

External links

1950 births
Living people
Skiers from Oslo
Norwegian male Nordic combined skiers
Olympic Nordic combined skiers of Norway
Nordic combined skiers at the 1972 Winter Olympics
20th-century Norwegian people